Abdoulaye Traoré (born 17 January 1988) is a Malian professional footballer who most recently played as a midfielder for Al-Nahda in 2018 and for the Mali national team.

Club career
Born in Bamako, Traoré began his career with Cercle Olympique de Bamako, where he played his first professional season in the Malien Premiere Division. After one year in the Malien Premiere Division he was in signed by FC Girondins de Bordeaux in July 2006. He played 43 games over two years for Bordeaux's reserve team, scoring three goals, before being promoted to the Ligue 1 team in July 2008.

In May 2017, it was announced Traoré would leave Bordeaux at the end of the 2016–17 season having spent 11 years at the club. In his time at the Girondins he made 91 Ligue 1 appearances, only 6 of which came in his last season there.

International career
Traoré is former member of Mali youth teams and made his first appearance for the Mali national team on 11 February 2009 against Angola.

International goals
Scores and results list Mali's goal tally first, score column indicates score after each Traoré goal.

Honours
Bordeaux
Ligue 1: 2008–09
Coupe de la Ligue: 2008–09
Coupe de France: 2012–13

Mali
Africa Cup of Nations bronze: 2012

References

External links

1988 births
Living people
Sportspeople from Bamako
Association football midfielders
Malian footballers
Mali international footballers
Malian expatriate footballers
2010 Africa Cup of Nations players
2012 Africa Cup of Nations players
CO de Bamako players
FC Girondins de Bordeaux players
OGC Nice players
Ligue 1 players
Expatriate footballers in France
2015 Africa Cup of Nations players
Al-Nahda Club (Saudi Arabia) players
Saudi First Division League players
Expatriate footballers in Saudi Arabia
Malian expatriate sportspeople in Saudi Arabia
21st-century Malian people